Gentianella campestris, common name field gentian, is a small herbaceous biennial flowering plant in the Gentianaceae (gentian family) native to Europe. Its bluish-purple flowers contain four petals.

Description
 Gentianella campestris is a biennial plant of small size, reaching on average  in height. It has erect stems, simple or branched at the base and the leaves are opposite, ovate-lanceolate and unstalked. Their color is usually bluish-purple, but may be white, pink or lilac, with petals and sepals fused (gamopetalous and gamosepalous). There are four petals, ciliate at the base. There are also four sepals, which differ in size (two are wide and two narrow). The flowering period extends from June to October. The fruit is a capsule.

Distribution
Field gentian is widespread in northern, central and southern Europe and its distribution range includes the European Alps and the Jura.

Gallery

Habitat
On the Isle of Man the species is found, and flourishes at sea level on the Ayres National Nature Reserve.

Subspecies
 Gentianella campestris subsp. baltica (Murb.) Á. Löve & D. Löve
 Gentianella campestris subsp. campestris
 Gentianella campestris subsp. suecica (Froel.) Tzvelev

References

External links

G. campestris
Plant Identification

campestris
Plants described in 1753
Taxa named by Carl Linnaeus